Species evenness refers to how close in numbers each species in an environment is. Mathematically it is defined as a diversity index, a measure of biodiversity which quantifies how equal the community is numerically. So if there are 40 foxes and 1000 dogs, the community is not very even. But if there are 40 foxes and 42 dogs, the community is quite even. The evenness of a community can be represented by Pielou's evenness index:

J' is constrained between 0 and 1. The less evenness in communities between the species (and the presence of a dominant species), the lower J' is. And vice versa.

Other indices have been proposed by authors where  e.g. Hurlburt's evenness index.

S is the total number of species.

Species evenness requires ecologists to know the abundance of species relative to other species in a given community. The methods used to measure abundance are area-based counts, distance methods, and mark-recapture studies. Area-based counts are used for measuring the abundance of immobile organisms and it involves measuring the number of organisms in a series of quadrants to get an estimate of the total population. In distance methods, the distance of individuals from a random point is collected and converted into the number of individuals per unit of area. Mark-recapture methods are useful for estimating the abundance of mobile organisms. Ecologists capture a subset of the population that they mark and release. The marked individuals are given time to move through the population, and then individuals are recaptured a second time. The proportion of marked individuals found in the recapture is used to estimate the total population size.

See also
Biodiversity

External links 

 

 

Measurement of biodiversity